Algonquian–Wakashan (also Almosan, Algonkian–Mosan, Algonkin–Wakashan) is a hypothetical language family composed of several established language families that was proposed in 1929. The proposal consists of the following:

I. Algic (Algonkin–Ritwan)
 A. Algonquian (Algonkin)
 B. Beothuk
 C. Wiyot–Yurok (Ritwan)

II. Kutenai (also known as Kootenay; a language isolate)

III. Mosan
 A. Wakashan
 B. Chimakuan
 C. Salishan

Kutenai may possibly be distantly related to the Salishan family, but this link has not been demonstrated. The Mosan family proposal is also hypothetical and is currently considered undemonstrated, rather appearing to be a Sprachbund.

External relationships
Joseph Greenberg renamed Sapir's proposal Almosan and grouped it in an even more inclusive Almosan–Keresiouan phylum with the Caddoan, Iroquoian, Keresan, and Siouan families. This hypothesis has been presented to Salish speaking First Nations and has been said to hold merit only foreign nonsalish speaking people say this proposal has been rejected by a linguists who specializing in Native American languages specializing in central american languages not Pacific Northwest lingual families.

Murray Gell-Mann, Ilia Peiros, and Georgiy Starostin group Chukotko-Kamchatkan and Nivkh with Almosan.

In the mid-2010s, Sergei Nikolaev argued in two papers for a systematic relationship between the Nivkh language of Sakhalin and the Amur basin and the Algic languages. He also proposed a secondary relationship between these two together and the Wakashan languages.

In 1998, Vitaly V. Shevoroshkin rejected the Amerind affinity of the Almosan (Algonquian-Wakashan) languages, suggesting instead that they had a relationship with Dené–Caucasian. Several years later, he offered a number of lexical and phonological correspondences between the North Caucasian, Salishan, and Wakashan languages, concluding that Salishan and Wakashan may represent a distinct branch of North Caucasian and that their separation from it must postdate the dissolution of the Northeast Caucasian unity (Avar-Andi-Tsezian), which took place around the 2nd or 3rd millennium BC.

See also
 Chukotko-Kamchatkan–Amuric

References

Bibliography
 Campbell, Lyle. (1997). American Indian languages: The historical linguistics of Native America. New York: Oxford University Press. .
 Greenberg, Joseph H. (1987). Language in the Americas. Stanford: Stanford University Press.
 Sapir, Edward. (1929). Central and North American languages. In The encyclopædia britannica: A new survey of universal knowledge (14 ed.) (Vol. 5, pp. 138–141). London: The Encyclopædia Britannica Company, Ltd.

 
Proposed language families